Márohu or Marohu may refer to:

 Marohu (aka Márohu, or Taino Marohu), the spirit of clear skies of the Taíno
 WASP-6 (star), Constellation Aquarius; a G8-type yellow dwarf star; named after the Taino Marohu